Hampstead is a satirical text adventure released for the ZX Spectrum and Commodore 64. The player begins the game in a filthy council flat, has to get a high-paying job in the city, woo a beautiful model and buy a house on Hampstead Heath. It was written by Trevor Lever and Peter Jones. It sold about 70,000 copies.

Legacy
In 2014 a version was released for the iPad.

References

External links 
 

BBC Micro and Acorn Electron games
ZX Spectrum games
Commodore 64 games
IOS games
1984 video games
1980s interactive fiction
Satirical video games
Social simulation video games
Video games developed in the United Kingdom
Video games set in London
Hampstead